Ulrich II of East Frisia, was count of East Frisia, (6 July 1605 – Aurich, 1 November 1648) was the fifth child and the third son of Enno III, Count of East Frisia and Anna of Holstein-Gottorp.  He inherited the East Frisia after the unexpected death of his brother Rudolf Christian on 17 April 1628.  He reigned during the Thirty Years' War.  East Frisia did not participate in the war, but general Ernst von Mansfeld quartered his troops in East Frisia, causing great distress.  The only exception was Emden because of the recently completed city wall, the city of Emden was protected against foreign troops.

Life 
Historian tend to have a negative view of Ulrich II.  His brother Rudolf Christian died unexpectedly, from a stab in his left eye during an argument with a lieutenant in the army of general Matthias Gallas quartered at Berum Castle.  He accepted the position of Count of East Frisia only reluctantly.  He was said to prefer to enjoy himself about town, deriving great pleasure from alcohol and well-prepared meals.  In the face of the foreign troops quartered in East Frisia during the Thirty Years' War, he was rather passive and let his chancellors Wiarda and Bobart manage the country.  He even went so far as to build a Lustschloss, the Julianenburg in Sandhorst, for his wife Landgravine Juliana, in the middle of the war, while the population of East Frisia was suffering bitterly.  However, he also made some major decisions.  He leased out parcels of bog around Timmel in 1633; this is regarded as the starting point of the fen cultivation, which led to the creation of the Großefehn.  He also founded Latin schools, the Ulrichsgymnasium in Norden in 1631 and the Gymnasium Ulricianum in Aurich in 1646.  These still exist and bear his name today.

He died on 1 November 1648.  After his death his widow Juliana took over the regency because their children were still minors.

Ancestors 

Ostfriesland, Ulrich II of
Ostfriesland, Ulrich II of
Counts of East Frisia